Al Wusta Region may refer to:
 Al Wusta Region (Oman)
 Al Wusta Region (Bahrain)

See also
 Al Wusta (disambiguation)